Yws Gwynedd is a Welsh rock band from North Wales named after its lead singer Ywain Gwynedd.

Background
The band achieved acclaim after their debut album Codi / \ Cysgu ("wake-up /\ sleep" in Welsh) in 2014 which won Best LP at Y Selar music awards that year and was nominated for best Welsh-language album at the Eisteddfod in 2015.

Their second album was released in 2017 having been recorded in two weeks. It was nominated for the 2017 Welsh-language album of the year award. and won the best album at Y Selar's awards.

The band perform regularly at Welsh music events and have headlined festivals such as Tafwyl and Maes B. In 2015 they performed at Festival Number 6 on the Clough stage and returned in 2017. They have performed on S4C and Radio Cymru multiple times.

One of the band's guitarists, Ifan Davies, is also the lead singer of the band Sŵnami.

"Perta" (originally called "Hi yw y Berta"), the Welsh entry for the Junior Eurovision Song Contest 2018, is written by lead singer Ywain. It was chosen internally by S4C and was be performed by Manw, the winner of the national final of S4C's Chwilio am Seren. Gwynedd has said that the lyrics were written with a focus on sounding nice to non-Welsh speakers, as well as being easy for viewers to sing along to.

#40Mawr
#40mawr is a radio programme and compilation CD of the 40 most popular Welsh-language songs as voted for by listeners of Radio Cymru each year. In 2016 the band's song "Sebona Fi" topped the #40Mawr chart and "Neb ar Ôl" came 35th. The next year "Sebona Fi" and " Drwy dy Lygid Di" featured on the updated list in first and 33rd place respectively.

Discography

Singles

Albums

Compilation albums

References 

Welsh-language bands
Welsh rock music groups
Musical groups established in 2014
2014 establishments in Wales